Aircraft Transport and Travel Limited was a British airline formed during the First World War, a subsidiary of Airco. It was the first airline to operate a regular international flight (between London and Paris).

History
On 5 October 1916, Aircraft Transport and Travel (AT&T) was formed by George Holt Thomas. Using a fleet of former military Airco DH.4A biplanes, it operated relief flights between Folkestone and Ghent. On 15 July 1919, the company flew a proving flight across the English Channel, despite a lack of support from the British government. Flown by Lt. H. Shaw in an Airco DH.9 between RAF Hendon and Paris–Le Bourget Airport, the flight took 2 hours and 30 minutes, and cost £21 per passenger.

On 25 August 1919, the company used DH.16s to start a regular service from Hounslow Heath Aerodrome to Le Bourget, the first regular (daily) international service in the world. The airline soon gained a reputation for reliability, despite problems with bad weather. In November 1919, it won the first British civil airmail contract. Six Royal Air Force Airco DH.9A aircraft, modified with Napier Lion engines were lent to the company from October 1919, to operate the airmail service between Hawkinge and Cologne, which Aircraft Transport and Travel took over from the RAF on 15 August 1919. In 1920, they were returned to the Royal Air Force.

In February 1920, with its parent Aircraft Manufacturing Company Limited (Airco), AT&T, also known as Airco Air Express, became part of the BSA Group. It continued operations, under the control of Frank Searle of Daimler Hire.

As well as the London (Hounslow) to Paris service, AT&T also operated a Croydon Airport to Amsterdam service on behalf of KLM. On 17 May 1920, a DH.16 (G-EALU) of AT&T operated the first KLM service between London and Amsterdam.

AT&T continued to operate, but Daimler-BSA withdrew support, and overcome with debt in November 1920 it was placed in liquidation, and on 17 December 1920, it ran its last service. Early in 1921, its assets were purchased by Daimler and rolled with Daimler Air Hire Limited into a new company called Daimler Airway Limited which continued the services.

By 1921, six companies operated a London to Paris service, three French and three British. The French airlines were receiving subsidies from the French government, and in protest the three British airlines stopped services on 28 February 1921.

Legacy
Through a series of takeovers and mergers, the modern-day British Airways can trace part of its legacy back to Aircraft Transport and Travel.

Aircraft

 Airco DH.4
 Airco DH.4A
 Airco DH.6
 Airco DH.9
 Airco DH.9A
 Airco DH.9B
 de Havilland DH.16
 de Havilland DH.18

See also
 List of defunct airlines of the United Kingdom

References

External links
British Airways history 1910-1919

Airlines established in 1916
Defunct airlines of the United Kingdom
Airlines disestablished in 1921
1916 establishments in England
1921 disestablishments in England
British companies disestablished in 1921
British companies established in 1916

sr:Ваздушни саобраћај